Property & Casualty Management Systems, Inc. (PCMS) is an American company best known for providing insurance-related software and services.

Background

PCMS is a privately held company based in Dallas, Texas. Founded in 1999 by Beryl Goldman, the company is a Microsoft Certified Partner. Goldman serves as company President and Jack Dennison is CEO.

Atlas software

PCMS’ software, Atlas, was launched in 1999 and re-designed in 2008. The Atlas system is administrative software specific to the insurance industry including components for underwriting and policy administration, claims management, and billing. PCMS reports that there are ten American P&C insurers live on Atlas, all with annual premium under $1 billion with half writing personal lines, and the other half writing commercial lines. All of the company's clients are on the latest release, which is less than 3 years old.

References

External links
Property & Casualty Management Systems Official site

Financial services companies established in 1999
Insurance companies based in Texas
Software companies established in 1999
1999 establishments in Texas